In enzymology, a progesterone 11alpha-monooxygenase is an enzyme that catalyzes the chemical reaction

progesterone + AH2 + O2  11alpha-hydroxyprogesterone + A + H2O

The 3 substrates of this enzyme are progesterone, AH2, and O2, whereas its 3 products are 11alpha-hydroxyprogesterone, A, and H2O.

This enzyme belongs to the family of oxidoreductases, specifically those acting on paired donors, with O2 as oxidant and incorporation or reduction of oxygen. The oxygen incorporated need not be derive from O miscellaneous.  The systematic name of this enzyme class is {{chem name|progesterone,hydrogen-donor:oxygen oxidoreductase (11alpha-hydroxylating)}}. This enzyme is also called .  This enzyme participates in c21-steroid hormone metabolism.

References

 

EC 1.14.99
Enzymes of unknown structure